Latino Americans have received a growing share of the national vote in the United States due to their increasing population. As of the 2020 U.S. Census, 62.1 million Latinos live in the United States, a 23% increase since 2010. According to the Brookings Institute, Latinos will become the nations largest minority by 2045. With the help of laws and court case wins, Latinos have been able to receive the help needed to participate in American Politics. They have traditionally been a key Democratic Party constituency, but more recently have begun to split between the Democratic and  Republican Party. Since the Latino population is large and diverse, a lot of political differences exist between gender, national origin, and generational groups.

Legal Background 
Before Latinos were allowed to vote, they faced a lot of voting discriminatory practices, especially in the Southwest region of the United States. After the Civil War, many Southern states, adopted discriminatory voting practices against African Americans, but also for anyone that was non-white. According to the Mexican American Legal Defense and Educational Fund, Texas laws prohibited Tejanos ( Texas residents that descended from Mexico), from speaking Spanish, organizing political demonstrations/protests or even from serving as election judges as early as 1845. By the 1900s poll taxes, and white primaries (only white people were allowed to participate in primaries), prohibited Mexican Americans from voting. It took several laws and court cases wins to remove voting barriers like this that prohibited Latinos from participating in U.S. politics.

Voting Rights Act of 1965 
The "Voting Rights Act of 1965" was signed into law by 36th U. S. President, Lyndon B.Johnson. The act made it illegal for states, mostly Southern states, to keep discriminatory voting practices in place. This included literacy tests and polling taxes. The law, most notably impacted African Americans as they were visibly disenfranchised from voting, but the act also helped remove barriers for Latino voters.

Voting Rights Act of 1965 impacts 
By 1966, after the "Voting Rights Act of 1965" was passed, voting discriminatory practices  were eliminated. However, the Latino community still faced language barriers to vote. As a result, the "Southwest Voter Registration Education" project was started in 1974, becoming the first and largest non-partisan organization in the U.S.. Founder William C. Velazquez, created the organization after realizing that language barriers remained for Latinos even after the Voting Rights Act of 1965 was passed. Many Latino voters, including Puerto Ricans, were unable to cast their vote between the time the VRA of 1965 was passed until its revision in 1975.

Voting Rights Act of 1975 
In 1975, 38th U.S. president, Gerald Ford, extended the VRA Act of 1965, to protect language minorities. Specifically, "Section 203 Language of the Voting Rights Act" was added into the act. According to the Census, the new provision required certain states (those that have had discriminatory voting practices) to provide language assistance and translated voting materials (e.g., registration forms, ballots, instructions) to language minority groups, during elections. The language minority groups that were included under the provision were those that spoke Asian, American Indian, Alaska Native, or Spanish. Additionally, these states would need the federal governments' permission to change their voting laws.

States need to provide language assistance if: 
 More than 5% of the voting age is not proficient in English

or

 More than 10,000 voting age citizens are not proficient in English

and

 The citizens that are limited English proficient have less than a 5th grade education

Voting Rights Act of 1975 impacts in Texas 
Texas was one of the states that had to abide by Section 203 of the VRA of 1975, due to its history of discriminatory voting practices. According to the Department of Justice, since 1982, Texas has had the highest number of voter change objections. Additionally there was 54 instances when Texas changed its discriminatory voting law proposals after they knew they would get rejected from the Department of Justice. Section 203, stopped states like Texas from continuing their voter disenfranchisement.

Impacts of the Voting Rights Act of 1975 
Since the enactment of the VRA of 1975, the Latino voting block increased by 183%. According to the National Research Council (US) Panel on Hispanics and the United States, Latino officeholders increased in the 6 states (Arizona, California, Florida, New Mexico, New York, and Texas) with the largest Latino population. In 1973, there were only 1,280 Latino officeholders across these 6 states, by 2003, there were 4,130. John A. Garcia, a political science researcher at the University of Michigan, explains that this increase in political representation, is due to the fact that the VRA of 1975, helped create an comfortable environment for Hispanics and Latinos to run for office positions in the Southwestern part of the United States.

In an additional study conducted by Political Scientists, Melissa Marschall and Amanda Rutherford, it was found that Section 203, led to increased Latino representation in political offices, and Latino voter participation. However the authors found that federal oversight alongside Section 203, ensured that adequately trained bilingual poll workers were present and that voting materials were translated. Without federal monitoring, Section 203 is not as effective.

In "Translating into Votes: The Electoral Impacts of Spanish-Language Ballots"  by Daniel J. Hopkins, it was found that the VRA of 1975 significantly increased Latino voter participation in California. The provision eased Spanish speakers anxiousness at the polls, and helped them vote down the ballot. However other studies, have argued that language assistance is less of an indicator for voter turnout compared to age and education level.

Aftermath of the Voting Rights Act of 1975 

 1982: After Section 203 was set to expire, it was renewed again for seven more years 
 1992:  After Section 203 was set to expire again, Rep. Jose E. Serrano (D-NY) introduced the Voting Rights Language Assistance Act, to extend the bill for 15 years, instead of having to renew it every 7 years. Supporters for the bill, argued that language assistance was necessary for newly naturalized citizens to be civically engaged, while opponents argued that the provision was costly, even suggesting to remove it completely. After the political battle, the legislation was signed and passed by President George H. W. Bush on August 26, 1992.
 2006: When the Voting Rights Language Assistance Act of 1992 was a year away from expiring, a new special provision was added and passed. It was called the "Fannie Lou Hamer, Rosa Parks, Coretta Scott King, Cesar E. Chavez, Barbara Jordan, William Velazquez and Dr. Hector Garcia Voting Rights Act Reauthorization and Amendments Act".

Notable court cases

Hernandez v. Texas (1954) 
In 1954, Pete Hernandez was charged with the murder of Joe Espinosa in Jackson County, Texas. Hernandez argued that the state had incorrectly indicted him, given that most of the jurors were white when Jackson county had a moderate-sized Hispanic population. The court found that 11% of Jackson County's population was over the age of 21 and had Spanish surnames, however in the last 25 years, no person with a Latin American name, had served on a jury. Because no Latino was chosen to serve on a jury among the 6,000 slots available in the last 25 years worth of cases, the court stated it was a form of discrimination, whether it was or wasn't a conscious decision by Texas. This case has been marked by many legal scholars as the first supreme courts decision to explicitly acknowledge discrimination against Latinos.

Hernandez v. Texas (1953) impact 
According to legal scholars, this court case recognized Latinos as a separate race/ethnicity from the binary races (Anglo and African Americans). The case proved that Latinos are not White nor African American, they are a part of their own distinct group. This played an important role in identity politics for the future. Since the court cases decision, court administrators are required to pull jurors from across a community. As a result, diversity in juries has increased, including Latino jurors.

Claudio Castaneda, Sheriff v. Rodrigo Partida (1977) 
In 1977, Rodrigo Partida was convicted of burglary and with the intent to rape in Hidalgo County, Texas. After being indicted, Partida argued that he was unfairly convicted, because Mexican-Americans were not represented in the jury. At the time, 79.2% of Hidalgos population had Mexican American surnames, but in Partidas' grand jury, only 40% were Mexican American. Texas argued that this was not evidence of discrimination, since Hidalgo county was run by a majority of Mexican Americans, at the time. The court found no evidence of discrimination, but Partida appealed this decision and the Fifth U.S. Circuit Court  reversed the original courts' decision. The Fifth U.S. Circuit Court was unable to rule out the possibility that Mexican Americans were being discriminated against even if they were the majority in Hidalgo County.

LULAC v. Perry (2006) 
In 2006, the League of United Latin American Citizens (LULAC) filed a lawsuit against formerTexas governor, Rick Perry. LULAC argued that the 2003 redistricting plan, which was controlled by Republicans, diluted Latinos' and African Americans' voting power, violating the Voting Rights Act of 1975. The courts' decision favored Perry, which helped the Republican party win five congressional seats in Texas and ultimately gain control of Congress that following midterm election.

Shelby v. Holder (2013) 
Under the Voting Rights Act of 1975, 11 states with voter discrimination history (Alabama, California, Florida, Georgia, Louisiana, Mississippi, New York, North Carolina, South Carolina, Texas, and Virginia), were required to seek approval from the Department of Justice (a process called "preclearance") if they wanted to amend a policy. However, in 2013, this "preclearance" requirement was taken away in the Shelby v. Holder case.

Shelby v. Holder (2013) impact 
In 2021,19 states, including Florida, Arizona and Texas enacted 34 restrictive voting laws which negatively impacted Latino voters. For example, Texas State Legislature SB 1, makes it difficult for Spanish speakers to cast their vote, since they wont be able to receive language assistance. Additionally voters will be required to have a monthly citizenship check, 24 hour voting drive thrus are banned. Republicans have argued that this bill is necessary in order to stop voter fraud.

Proposed Solution: The John Lewis Voting Rights Advancement Act of 2021 
In reaction to the Shelby v. Holder (2013) decision, the John Lewis Voting Rights Advancement Act of 2021 (VRAA) was proposed to restore the "preclearance" aspect of the Voting Rights Act of 1975. The Department of Justice would decide whether a voting law violates voters' rights. If so, states will be covered by preclearance for the following 10 years.

States wold be covered by preclearance if:

 Their local governments have committed at least 10 voting right violations within the past 25 years
 Subdivisions in non covered states have committed at least three voting rights violations in the past 25 years

On November 3, 2021, the VRAA failed to pass the Senate. It was proposed a second time on January 19, 2022, but it failed again.

Presidential voting pattern 
Supermajority support for Democratic candidates is a pattern among Latino voters. In a 2021 Gallup poll, 56% of Latinos identified with the Democratic party, and 26% said they were Republicans. This Democratic support has been consistent throughout presidential elections.

Political ideology 
When Latinos first immigrate to the United States they do not immediately align themselves with a political party or ideology. According to Political Scientists, Lisa Garcia Bedolla and Ramon Michael Alvarez, newly naturalized Latinos are independent, but as they become socialized into American politics, they begin to lean toward a political party. Historically, Mexican Americans attach themselves to the Democratic Party where as Cubans and Puerto Ricans associate themselves with the Republican party. Studies have tried to explain why differences in political ideology exist within the Latino population, as national origin, gender, or even religion can create differences.

Democratic support 
Since 1984, the majority of Latinos have supported and identified with the Democratic Party. In every election since 1984, over 57% of Latinos have voted for Democratic presidential candidates. A study conducted by Political Scientists, Leonie Huddy, Lilliana Mason, and S. Nechama Horwitz, explains why Latinos have historically preferred the Democratic Party over the Republican Party. They find that those who identify strongly with their Hispanic identity and believe that their ethnic group is discriminated against, end up strongly supporting the Democratic Party. This was observed heavily in the 2012 election when the Republican Party expressed an anti-Latino and anti-immigration attitude, which in turn motivated Latinos to support the party in opposition: the Democrats.  The study also showed that Mexicans, Central Americans and Dominicans are more likely than Cubans to support the Democratic Party. An additional explanation for Latinos' support toward the Democratic Party is provided by Political Scientist, Angel Saavedra Cisneros, who argues that Latinos are Democratic because they are most interested on economic and migration issues, in which the party positively addresses.

Republican support 

In recent years, multiple news outlets have published stories, that Latinos are shifting toward the Republican party given that they have usually outspent Democrats on trying to gain Latino Support. Lionel Sosa, an advertising executive, told Ronald Reagan, "Latinos are Republican, they just dont know it yet". Whereas former Senate Democrat Harry Reid, in 2010 said, "I don’t know how anyone of Hispanic heritage who could be a Republican. Do I need to say more?". Angel Saavedra Cisneros, a Political Scientist, published a book called, "Latino Republicans", to determine whether this is true.

Religion and conservatism 
According to the Pew Research Center, 77% of Latinos or Christian. A lot of Republicans, claim that Latinos' religiosity should make them support Republicans' conservative policy stances. Academics have tried to understand whether this is true. In a 2000 study, Political Scientist's, Sean M.Bolks, Diana Evans, J.L. Polinard, and Robert D. Wrinkle, discovered that Latinos are opposed to abortions, like Republicans. Political scientist, Marisa A. Abrajano, found that these conservative positions is what drew Latinos to vote for George W. Bush in the 2004, presidential election. This was the largest percentage of votes (40%) that the Republican party has ever received from Latinos during a presidential election. Other academics have just argued that Latinos liked George W. Bush as a candidate, rather than his party's ideological stances. Some Political scientist, like, Catherine E. Wilson, argue the opposite, that churches push Latinos towards the Democratic party.

Gender and conservatism 

Latino men have historically voted more Republican than Latinas since the late1980s. Christina Bejarano, a Political Scientist at Texas Woman's University, found that Latino men tend to hold on to their conservative values when they migrate, whereas Latinas become ideologically liberal as generations pass. In 1988, researcher, Jones Correa, tried to find explanations for this phenomenon. He found that men experience downward mobility once they migrate to the United States, whereas women have upward mobility. Therefore, men try to hold on to their conservative values, to validate themselves and women try to become more independent. Other studies have tried to explain this political gender gap as a result of moving from a traditional Latin American country to the egalitarian country of the United States.

Cubans and conservatism 

Historically, Cubans are one of the few Latino national origin groups that have consistently been strong supporters of the Republican party. In the 2016 presidential election, over half of the Cuban population, voted for Donald Trump. Sociologist, Alejandro Portes, and politician, Rafael Mozo, have tried to explain why Cubans do not vote for the Democratic Party. They find that Cubans support the Republican Party out of fear that Democrats will turn the United States into a communist country . Other studies have argued that Cubans do not vote for Democrats because they do not experience immigration related issues, since they are able to apply for permanent residency, a year after arriving to the United States, through the Cuban Adjustment Act of 1966.

Alternative perspectives 
Other studies have tried to fully disprove that Latinos are becoming Republican. Eric Gonzalez Juenke, a Political Science researcher at Michigan State University, found that most conservative Latinos are not citizens, therefore they cant vote and express their support to the Republican party through elections. Therefore, citizenship needs to be considered when interviewing Latinos about their political opinions, as this can be misleading information in upcoming elections.

Political interest and participation among Latinos 

A study by Professor Maria E. Len-Ríos of the University of Georgia suggests that Latinos’ level of political interest is positively associated with their level of engagement. Len-Ríos collected data from a national survey of 434 Latinos, 26.8% of whom said that they were interested in politics. Additionally, one in five people reported interacting with a campaign on social media; 6% had donated to a campaign before; and one in ten had sent an email to their elected representatives. Between the political interest and political participation variables there was a statistically significant correlation. In other words, individuals who were interested in politics were more involved in politics than people who were less interested.

2016 and 2020 presidential election 

In the 2020 presidential election, Latino turnout surpassed past voting records. The Pew Research Center found that 54% of registered Latino voters were motivated to vote in the election that year. By comparison, 69% of all U.S. registered voters said they were motivated to vote. Half of eligible Latinos (53.7%) ended up voting that year. This increased mobilization in 2016 and 2020 has been explained by various studies as a result of Donald Trumps' xenophobic attitude and targets toward the Latino population. His anti-immigration rhetoric emotionally angered Latinos, which created a pan-ethnic solidarity movement amongst them, driving them to the polls to vote against Trump during both elections.

Churches role in political engagement 

Researchers have tried to determine whether church attendance increases Latinos participation in American Politics. In study conducted by researchers, Sarah Allen Gershon, Adrian D. Pantoja and J.Benjamin Taylor, they found that church attendance does correlate to civic engagement, however other factors such as generational status, economic status and employment can influence this. Given that younger generations of Latinos attend church at a lesser rate than older generations, demographic factors will determine whether they are politically engaged or not.

Media and Latino politics 
Most Latinos obtain their news from Spanish language television networks. Given this, many academics have attempted to analyze the relationship between media and Latino politics.

Media 
In a study conducted by Political Scientists, Sergio I. Garcia-Rios and Matt A. Barreto, it was found that Univision and other Spanish language news outlets, created a pan ethnic identity amongst Latinos, which motivated  them to vote in a historically large number in the 2012 presidential election. Since immigration was a main debate topic during election season, Latinos were reminded of their immigrant identity even as U.S. citizens. Spanish news media influencers, such as Jorge Ramos, Maria Elena Salinas, and Pilar Marero, made frequent announcements to the Latino community, reporting the immigration issues that were at stake if they didn't vote. In culmination, these factors motivated Latinos to vote.

In another study, Swiss academic, Felix Oberholzer-Gee and American economist, Joel Waldfogel, tried to find whether general Spanish language television networks increase Latino voter turnout. Their results were significant, indicating that the presence of Spanish language television networks like Univision, can increase civic engagement among Latinos.

Univision voter registration campaigns 

Univision is the nations largest Spanish language television network. According to Della de Lafuente, Emmy award-winning journalist and former president of the National Association of Hispanic Journalists (NAHJ), Univision provides the Latino community resources such as for finding a doctor, a school for their children, or a job. Since 2007, they have also initiated efforts to politically mobilize the Latino community. In 2007, the network made history by hosting and broadcasting the first presidential debates in Spanish. In the 2008 primary elections, Univision released a "Ve y Vota en las Primarias" ("Get Out and Vote in the Primaries) 30-second ad to its viewers. Cesar Conde former chief strategist for Univision, stated that the network is making it a priority to help inform and motivate Latinos about the political process. The television network has continued on these efforts from national to local elections.

Univision and the 2016 presidential election 

During the 2016 presidential election, Univision carried out a voter registration campaign (#VotaConmigo) to increase Latino voter participation. In February 2016, Univision announced its attempts to register over 3 million new Latino voters, based on the number of Latinos that became eligible to vote since the last presidential election in 2012. Jessica Herrera-Flanigan, Univision's executive Vice President, stated to the Washington Post, "As a media company, we have the ability to educate and tell people whats happening on air and off air...We have the voice." Following their campaign announcement, the television network broadcast commercials, encouraging people to call the citizenship hotline, National Association of Latino Elected and Appointed Officials (NALEO). In the next month, William Valdes, cohost of Despierta America, a morning segment, hosted a Facebook Live, talking about his U.S. citizenship process. That day, NALEO received 20,000 calls, surpassing the other days' average of 100 calls. Univision ended up registering over 200,000 new Latinos to vote in 2016.

Criticism of Univision 
A Washington Post op-ed, by Callum Brochers, argued that Univisions' campaigns are designed to help the Democratic party, not to help Latinos become politically involved. As evidence, Callum, revealed that Haim Saban, Univisions' chairman, has consistently donated money to the Democratic party. In the 2016 election, Haim Saban donated $2.5 million to Priorities USA Action, a super Political Action Committee(PAC), that supported Hilary Clintons campaign. Ken Oliver-Mendez, a director of an organization that tracks liberal bias, also shared that Univision broadcasts liberal leaning news as Republicans are not covered fairly within the platform. In the 2020 presidential election, Donald Trumps campaign called Univision, "Leftist propaganda". However, Univision has continuously stated that it is a non-partisan, television network.

Trends in the South 
While Latinos have long been a major factor in Texas, millions more have arrived there and in other Southern states in recent years. Historian Raymond Mohl emphasizes the role of NAFTA in lowering trade barriers and facilitating large-scale population movements. He adds other factors such as the ongoing economic crisis in Mexico, more liberal immigration policies in the United States, labor recruitment, and smuggling that have produced a major flow of Mexican and Latin American migration to the Southeast.

Notable Latino politicians

Past senators 

 Octaviano A. Larrazolo (R-NM) 1928-1929 : He was the first Mexican American and first Latino United States senator.
 Dennis Chavez (D-NM) 1935-1962 : He was the first Hispanic Democrat elected in the U.S. Senate. He was also the longest serving Hispanic U.S. senator.
 Joseph M. Montoya (D-NM) 1964-1977: He was the youngest representative in the history of the state to be elected to the New Mexico House of Representative at the age of 22. Then became senator in 1964.
 Kenneth L. Salazar (D-CO) 2005-2009: He became the first Hispanic American from Colorado to serve in the U.S. Senate.
 Mel Martinez (R-FL) 2005-2009: He and Ken Salazar were the first Hispanic politicians to be voted into the U.S. Senate since 1977.

Current senators
There are 6 Latino Senators in the United States Senate, 4 Latino Democrats and 2 Latino Republicans.
Catherine Cortez Masto (D-NV),  first Latina elected to serve as a U.S. Senator from Nevada.
Ted Cruz (R-TX),  first Latino American to serve as a U.S. senator from Texas, former 2016 Presidential candidate.
Ben Ray Luján (D-NM), first Latino Chairman of the Democratic Congressional Campaign Committee (DCCC).
Bob Menendez (D-NJ),  sixth Latino to serve in the United States Senate.
Alex Padilla (D-CA), first Mexican American and Latino senator from California.
Marco Rubio (R-F), first Cuban American to be speaker of the Florida House of Representatives, former 2016 Presidential candidate.

Representatives

There are 41 Latino Representatives in the United States House of Representatives, 31 Latino Democrats and 10 Latino Republicans.

Antonio Delgado (D-NY 19th District): first person of Latin American descent to be elected to Congress from Upstate New York
Adriano Espaillat, (D-NY 13th District): first formerly undocumented immigrant to ever serve in Congress.
Raúl Grijalva (D-AZ 7th District): dean of Arizona's Congressional Delegation
Brian Mast (R-FL 21st District): Staff Sergeant in the U.S. Army, Rep. Mast lost both of his legs while serving as an explosive ordnance disposal technician in the U.S. Army in 2010. Awarded the Bronze Star, Purple Heart, Defense Meritorious Service Medal and Army Commendation Medal for actions in service.
Alex Mooney (R-VA 2nd District): first Latino man elected to Congress from West Virginia
Alexandria Ocasio-Cortez (D-NY 13th District): Took office in 2019 at age 29 as the youngest woman ever to serve in the United States Congress, among the first female members of the Democratic Socialists of America elected to serve in Congress.
Raul Ruiz (D-CA 25th District): first Latino to receive three graduate degrees from Harvard University- attending Harvard Medical School, the John F. Kennedy School of Government and Harvard School of Public Health.
Maria Elvira Salazar (R-FL 27th District): former journalist, recipient of five Emmy Awards for several reports on Nicaragua, Cuba and Dominican Republic.
Linda Sanchez (D-CA 38th District): first woman of color ever to be elected to a leadership position in the history of the U.S. Congress
Ritchie Torres (D-NY 15th District):  first openly gay Afro Latino elected to Congress, one of the first two openly gay Black men elected to Congress.
Nydia Velázquez (D-NY 7th District): first Puerto Rican woman to serve in the United States Congress.

2023 Midterm Election 
The 2023 class of incoming Congress members is historic for the Latino community. This is the largest cohort of Latinos to be sworn into Congress. According to Vox News, 14 Latino candidates were elected to join the 34 incumbents, indicating that the 118th Congress class will be 11% Latino (34 Democrats, 11 Republicans). Representative Ruben Gallego (D-AZ), commented, "Invest in Latino voters. Talk to Latino voters early and recruit Latinos and Latinas to run and not just in majority Latino districts", after the midterm outcomes.

Latino political organizations 
Chicanos Por La Causa
Congressional Hispanic Caucus
Congressional Hispanic Conference
Hispanic Democratic Organization
National Association of Latino Elected and Appointed Officials
National Institute for Latino Policy
Tomas Rivera Policy Institute
UnidosUS
United We Dream
Voto Latino  
Mi Familia Vota  
League of United Latin American Citizens (LULAC)  
Latino Victory Fund

Notable protests 

 A Day Without Immigrants
 2006 United States Immigration Reform Protest
 March 2006 LAUSD Student Walkout

See also
Hispanic and Latino conservatism in the United States
Congressional Hispanic Caucus
Latino Americans in the United States Congress
Hispanic Democratic Organization
List of Latino Republicans
List of Latino Democrats

References

Politics of the United States
Hispanic and Latino American